Huntington is a census-designated place (CDP) in Fairfax County, Virginia, United States. The population was 11,267 at the 2010 census. It is located next to the southern border of the city of Alexandria and is part of the Washington metropolitan area. Its main component is the namesake Huntington subdivision, a late-1940s neighborhood of mainly duplex homes.

In June 2006, the lower-lying northern section was ravaged by floods due to a torrential rainstorm that sent adjoining Cameron Run over its banks. Nevertheless, it remains popular with first-time home buyers due largely to its proximity to the Huntington Metro station, the southern terminus of Metrorail's Yellow Line. There are also several high-rise apartment and condominium complexes on and near U.S. Route 1 where much of the CDP's population resides. The area is included in ZIP code 22303 and has an Alexandria mailing address, although it is outside the city limits.

Geography
Huntington is located in southeastern Fairfax County at  (38.792563, −77.072120). It is bordered to the north by the city of Alexandria, to the southeast by Belle Haven, and to the west by Rose Hill. U.S. Route 1 forms the border between Huntington and Belle Haven, and the boundary with Rose Hill is drawn to follow Poag Street, Shaffer Drive, Florence Lane, and Telegraph Road.

Demographics
As of the census of 2000, there were 8,325 people, 4,615 households, and 1,675 families residing in the CDP. The racial makeup of the CDP was 64.95% White, 16.74% African American, 0.40% Native American, 7.02% Asian, 0.16% Pacific Islander, 6.91% from other races, and 3.83% from two or more races. Hispanic or Latino of any race were 14.01% of the population.

There were 4,615 households, out of which 11.9% had children under the age of 18 living with them, 26.8% were married couples living together, 6.7% had a female householder with no husband present, and 63.7% were non-families. 52.6% of all households were made up of individuals, and 7.6% had someone living alone who was 65 years of age or older. The average household size was 1.80 and the average family size was 2.75.

In the CDP, the population was spread out, with 13.0% under the age of 18, 10.0% from 18 to 24, 43.2% from 25 to 44, 23.4% from 45 to 64, and 10.4% who were 65 years of age or older. The median age was 36 years. For every 100 females, there were 101.9 males. For every 100 females age 18 and over, there were 100.9 males.

The median income for a household in the CDP was $52,364, and the median income for a family was $62,228. Males had a median income of $43,429 versus $36,563 for females. The per capita income for the CDP was $36,945. About 6.8% of families and 7.7% of the population were below the poverty line, including 19.0% of those under age 18 and 0.6% of those age 65 or over.

References

External links
 Huntington Community Association
 Cameron Run Flood Investigation of Huntington Flood

Census-designated places in Virginia
Census-designated places in Fairfax County, Virginia
Washington metropolitan area
Virginia populated places on the Potomac River